Allan Agapitos Morris (born 26 July 1940) is a former Australian politician. Born in Waratah, New South Wales, he was educated at the University of Newcastle and became a computer programmer. He served on Newcastle City Council and Shortland County Council; his brother, Peter Morris, was a Labor member of the Australian House of Representatives, representing the seat of Shortland. In 1983, Allan too was elected to the House as the Labor member for Newcastle. He held the seat until his retirement in 2001.

References

Australian Labor Party members of the Parliament of Australia
New South Wales local councillors
Members of the Australian House of Representatives for Newcastle
Members of the Australian House of Representatives
1940 births
Living people
21st-century Australian politicians
20th-century Australian politicians